Conrad II the Younger was the Count of Auxerre from 864 until his death in 876. He was a son of Conrad I of Auxerre, and Adelaide of Tours; an older brother of Hugh the Abbot; and a member of the Bavarian branch of the Welfs.

In 858, at the coaxing of Charles the Bald, his cousin, he and his brother betrayed Louis the German when he sent them on an espionage mission and went over to Charles, who rewarded them handsomely because he had lost his Bavarian honores. He acted as Duke of Transjurane (Upper) Burgundy from then until about 864.

He married Waldrada of Worms, by whom he left a son, Rudolf, who later became King of Transjurane Burgundy, and a daughter, Adelaide of Auxerre, who married Richard, Duke of Burgundy, and had issue.  Some online family trees may have him also married to Judith of Friuli, but there is no source for this, and she is not known to have married to anyone.

References

Sources

Nobility of the Carolingian Empire
876 deaths
Dukes of Burgundy
Year of birth unknown